Kadkan District is a district (bakhsh) in Torbat-e Heydarieh County, Razavi Khorasan Province, Iran. At the 2006 census, its population was 11,855, in 2,941 families.  The District has one city: Kadkan. The District has two rural districts (dehestan): Kadkan Rural District and Roqicheh Rural District.

References 

Districts of Razavi Khorasan Province
Torbat-e Heydarieh County